The Rikuzen flounder (Dexistes rikuzenius) is a flatfish of the family Pleuronectidae. Its native habitat is the northwestern Pacific, particularly the Sea of Japan and the coastlines of Japan and Korea.

Etymology

The fish is named after Rikuzen Province, an old province of Japan.

Diet

The Rikuzen flounder's diet consists of benthos invertebrates such as crabs, shrimps, marine worms and brittle stars.

References

Rikuzen flounder
Fish of Japan
Fish of Korea
Rikuzen flounder
Rikuzen flounder
Rikuzen flounder